Road 73 is a road in  Golestan Province of northern Iran. It connects the Turkmenistan border crossing to Aq Qala and Gorgan in Golestan Province. 

This road is part of Asian Highway, signed AH70.

See also

References

External links 

 Iran road map on Young Journalists Club

73
Transportation in Golestan Province
Iran–Turkmenistan border crossings